The London Games Festival is an annual video gaming festival for both consumers and trade specialists held annually in April. The Festival is part of Games London an initiative to boost investment and skills in the capital, delivered by Ukie and Film London and funded by £1.2 million investment from the Mayor of London.

Dates and events

Previous years

A previous London Games Festival ran until 2012 featuring a series of diverse events from the world of interactive entertainment. Video games publishers, developers, partners, personalities, trade organisations, media organisations and individuals were all involved in the week-long celebrations. The LGF provided the industry with the opportunity to showcase creativity and artistry, from script-writers to animators, musicians to programmers.

The Festival also worked to enhance perceptions of interactive entertainment and the industry by engaging with existing institutional advocates (BAFTA, ELSPA, DfES, DCMS, BBFC, DTI, LDA) and illustrating compelling and positive research while promoting future vision and horizons of the games industry. Alongside the week of media and/or consumer-facing events were a number of B2B events organised by the industry's trade bodies and other organisations.

The festival was also complemented by a Fringe, an offshoot of the more mainstream and commercially focused Festival, with an abundance of interesting and diverse events for games and non-gamers alike.  Highlights in 2007 included:

The Soho Project, that offered players a chance to take part in a mass ‘reality game’ on the streets of Soho, via the website.

Games AV - a live concert, screening and club night features musicians, DJs, VJs, filmmakers, animators and digital artists whose work has been shaped by video games culture.

Sense of Play ran annually as part of the Fringe from 2005–2007. Each event was a one-day symposium which looked at the future of games design in its broadest sense featuring some of the most inspiring voices working in, around and beyond the games industry. The event was directed, curated and produced by Toby Barnes and Jon Weinbren. Plans are afoot for a relaunch which will look at the interplays and crossovers between games, film, television, theatre and other creative industries.

Also in 2007, London Games Skills Week offered a week long series of seminars designed to attract new talent into the games industry from a broad spectrum of creative disciplines. A pop-up Games Fringe Cafe and drop-in lounge was set up at Soho TV and post-production training facility 01zero-one which was open to all festival attendees. 01zero-one also housed the ZeroGamer exhibition which featured "...games that play themselves, video documents of in-game performance, game engine experiments and challenging documentaries on gameplay."

References

External links
 London Games Festival website
 Introducing Games London and the London Games Festival – archived article from the Ukie website
 Now Play This – dedicated site

Festivals in London
Video gaming in the United Kingdom
Video game festivals
Annual events in London